Tieshan Township is a township in Qiezihe District, Qitaihe, Heilongjiang, China. , it administers the following nine villages, two forestry farms, and one development base:
Tieshan Village
Xinfa Village
Chuangxin Village
Lixin Village
Hongxing Village
Tiedong Village
Tiexi Village
Sixin Village
Wuxing Village
Tieshan Forestry Farm
Longshan Forestry Farm
Qitaihe Mining Company Agricultural and Sideline Production Development Base

References 

Township-level divisions of Heilongjiang
Qitaihe